Ojai is a 2018 EP by Young & Sick. It was his second release, following his self-titled album in 2014.

Songs
In an interview, Young & Sick described the EP as showcasing "a nice range of what the next phase of Young & Sick will be."

On the songwriting process for the EP's first track and titular single, "Ojai," Young & Sick described his experience staying in a hotel in Ojai, California:

Release
The EP was released in 2018, along with a limited-edition yellow vinyl record with red and black splatter designed by Young & Sick containing the first two songs on the EP. Young & Sick expressed his pride in the design, calling it "one of the wackiest, in-depth pieces of art I’ve made." Along with the record, Young & Sick also released a number of visual designs for the release of the EP, including three pairs of sneakers and a hoodie.

Critical reception 
The EP was well-received by critics. Regarding the EP's cover of Fleetwood Mac's "Dreams," online music publication Earmilk noted that the cover proves that Young & Sick "can take on the classics," and sounds "[d]renched in California sunshine with a dash of twinkly lo-fi indie sensibility." Earmilk also reviewed the single "Ojai," calling it a "near-perfect pop song." On the single "The Road," Complex said that Young & Sick "uses the raw and track to further encapsulate his recent travels throughout small town America." The EP ends off with a "gorgeously pared-down solo piano version of EP single 'Ojai, as described by BroadwayWorld.

Track listing

References 

2018 EPs